Keep the River on Your Right: A Modern Cannibal Tale is a 2000 documentary film about the travels of American anthropologist and artist Tobias Schneebaum, directed by brother-and-sister filmmakers David Shapiro and Laurie Gwen Shapiro.

Content
Taking its title from his 1969 book, Keep the River on Your Right, the film covers material from several of Schneebaum's other books and articles. In the film, Schneebaum, by then an elderly man, revisits two cannibal tribes—one in Papua New Guinea and the other in the jungles of Peru—with whom he had lived several years each as a young man. He and the filmmakers manage to locate a few of the individuals he had known well during those periods.

Personal participation
Schneebaum is remarkably honest about his same-sex relationships with members of both tribes, his childhood fetishizing of cannibalism, and his actual tasting of human flesh with one group. His extensive training in art allowed him to bond with different cultures he studied through sharing carving and painting techniques.

Awards
The film won a 2001 Independent Spirit Award.

References

External links

2000 films
American documentary films
American LGBT-related films
Documentary films about LGBT topics
Works about cannibalism
Anthropology documentary films
2000 documentary films
2000 LGBT-related films
2000s American films